Xanthoparmelia lavicola is a species of lichen in the family Parmeliaceae that can be found in Mexico north to Arizona and California in the United States. It has also been found in Ecuador. Xanthoparmelia lavicola grows in dry habitats on acidic rocks. It has been called the trochanter lichen.

Description
The upper part is either light yellow or yellow-green and the bottom surface is brown. The disc is either cinnamon-brown or dark brown and is ellipsoid. The pycnidia is immersed, while the conidia are bifusiform.

See also
List of Xanthoparmelia species

References

lavicola
Lichen species
Lichens of North America
Lichens of Ecuador
Taxa named by Vilmos Kőfaragó-Gyelnik
Lichens described in 1934